Padanaha is a village development committee in Bardiya District in Lumbini Province of south-western Nepal. At the time of the 1991 Nepal census it had a population of 7,186 and had 888 houses in the town.

References

Bhairab Academy English Medium School is also located Padanaha. It is one of the oldest Indo-Nepal cross-border markets of Bardiya district. Padanaha now aggregated in Barbardiya Municipality according to Federal structure of Nepal. This place is near Bardiya National Park.

Populated places in Bardiya District